2,3-Diaminopropionic acid (2,3-diaminopropionate, Dpr) is a non-proteinogenic amino acid found in certain secondary metabolites, including zwittermicin A and tuberactinomycin.

Biosynthesis
2,3-Diaminopropionate is formed by the pyridoxal phosphate (PLP) mediated amination of serine.

References 

Amino acids
Carboxylic acids